Cunac is a commune in the Tarn department in southern France.

Cunac marks the most easterly part of the Gaillac wine region.

See also
Communes of the Tarn department

References

Communes of Tarn (department)